Konstantin Karlovich Albrecht (4 October 183626 June 1893) was a cellist in the Moscow Bolshoi Theater orchestra, a teacher and administrator. Interested in choral music, he founded the Moscow Choral Society in 1878. He also helped to found the Russian Musical Society and the Moscow Conservatory.

Friendship with Tchaikovsky 

Tchaikovsky and Albrecht met while both were working at the Moscow Conservatory. The two became friends, and Tchaikovsky dedicated his Serenade for Strings to Albrecht. Tchaikovsky also contributed to Albrecht's Collections of Choral Pieces for Single and Mixed Voices.

See also 
 with Tchaikovsky List of letters from Tchaikovsky to Albrecht at Tchaikovsky Research

References 

Composers from the Russian Empire
Musicians from the Russian Empire
Academic staff of Moscow Conservatory
1836 births
1893 deaths
19th-century composers
Cellists